Dichomeris semicuprata is a moth in the family Gelechiidae. It was described by Edward Meyrick in 1922.

Distribution
Dichomeris semicuprata can be found in the country of Peru.

Physical Features
The forewings are dark violet grey with a fine yellowish supramedian line from the base to one-fourth and two slight yellow marks between the apex of this and the costa. There is a moderate blackish fascia before the middle, not reaching the dorsum. A coppery-brown-reddish patch occupies nearly all of the apical half of the wing, edged anteriorly with ochreous whitish towards the costa. The hindwings are dark fuscous.

References

Moths described in 1922
semicuprata